Fragaria is a genus of flowering plants in the rose family, Rosaceae, commonly known as strawberries for their edible fruits. There are more than 20 described species and many hybrids and cultivars. The most common strawberries grown commercially are cultivars of the garden strawberry, a hybrid known as Fragaria × ananassa. Strawberries have a taste that varies by cultivar, and ranges from quite sweet to rather tart. Strawberries are an important commercial fruit crop, widely grown in all temperate regions of the world.

Description
Strawberries are not berries in the botanical sense. The fleshy and edible part of the "fruit" is a receptacle, and the parts that are sometimes mistakenly called "seeds" are achenes and therefore the true botanical fruits.

Etymology
The Latin name is thought in turn to derive from a PIE root meaning "berry".

The English word is found in Old English as streawberige. It is commonly thought that strawberries get their name from straw being used as a mulch in cultivating the plants, though it has been suggested that the word is possibly derived from "strewn berry" in reference to the runners that "strew" or "stray away" from the base of the plants. Streaw in Old English means 'straw', but also streawian means 'to strew', from the same root. David Mikkelson argues that "the word 'strawberry' has been part of the English language for at least a thousand years, well before strawberries were cultivated as garden or farm edibles."

Classification
There are more than 20 different Fragaria species worldwide. A number of other species have been proposed, some of which are now recognized as subspecies. One key to the classification of strawberry species is that they vary in the number of chromosomes. They all have seven basic types of chromosomes,  but exhibit different polyploidy. Some species are diploid, having two sets of the seven chromosomes (14 chromosomes total), but others are tetraploid (four sets, 28 chromosomes total), hexaploid (six sets, 42 chromosomes total), octoploid (eight sets, 56 chromosomes total), or decaploid (ten sets, 70 chromosomes total).

As a rough rule (with exceptions), strawberry species with more chromosomes tend to be more robust and produce larger plants with larger berries.

The oldest fossils confidently classifiable as Fragaria are from the Miocene of Poland. Fossilised Fragaria achenes are also known from the Pliocene of China.

Diploid species

Fragaria × bifera Duchesne - F. vesca × F. viridis (Europe)
Fragaria bucharica Losinsk. (China)
Fragaria daltoniana J.Gay (Himalayas)
 Fragaria emeiensis Jia J. Lei (China)
Fragaria gracilis Losinsk. (China)
Fragaria iinumae Makino (East Russia, Japan)
Fragaria mandshurica Staudt (China)
Fragaria nilgerrensis Schlecht. ex J.Gay (South and Southeast Asia)
Fragaria nipponica Makino (Korea, Japan)
Fragaria nubicola Lindl. ex Lacaita (Himalayas)
Fragaria pentaphylla  Losinsk. (China)
Fragaria vesca L. - woodland strawberry (Northern Hemisphere)
Fragaria viridis Duchesne (Europe, Central Asia)
Fragaria yezoensis H.Hara (Northeast Asia)

Tetraploid species
Fragaria moupinensis Cardot (China)
Fragaria orientalis Losinsk. (Eastern Asia, Eastern Siberia)

Pentaploid hybrids
Fragaria × bringhurstii Staudt (coast of California)

Hexaploid species
Fragaria moschata Duchesne - musk strawberry (Europe)

Octoploid species and hybrids
Fragaria × ananassa Duchesne ex Rozier - garden strawberry, pineapple strawberry
Fragaria chiloensis (L.) Mill. - beach strawberry (Western Americas)
Fragaria chiloensis subsp. chiloensis forma chiloensis
Fragaria chiloensis subsp. chiloensis forma patagonica (Argentina, Chile)
Fragaria chiloensis subsp. lucida (E. Vilm. ex Gay) Staudt (coast of British Columbia, Washington, Oregon, California)
Fragaria chiloensis subsp. pacifica Staudt (coast of Alaska, British Columbia, Washington, Oregon, California)
Fragaria chiloensis subsp. sandwicensis (Decne.) Staudt - ōhelo papa (Hawaii)
Fragaria virginiana Mill. - Virginia strawberry (North America)

Decaploid species and hybrids
Fragaria cascadensis K.E. Hummer (Cascade Mountains in Oregon)
Fragaria iturupensis Staudt - Iturup strawberry (Iturup, Kuril Islands)
Fragaria × Comarum hybrids
Fragaria × vescana

Uncategorized hybrids
'Lipstick' (Fragaria × Comarum hybrid), red-flowered runnering ornamental, sparse small globular fruits.
Fragaria vesca and certain other diploid species can be hybridized and produce fertile offspring (although Fragaria nilgerrensis appears less compatible).
Fragaria moschata can hybridize with diploid species such as Fragaria viridis and Fragaria nubicola but producing a lower proportion of viable seeds.
Fragaria moschata can hybridize with Fragaria × ananassa.

Ecology
A number of species of butterflies and moths feed on strawberry plants: see list of Lepidoptera that feed on strawberry plants.

See also
 Accessory fruit
 Mock strawberry (Duchesnea/Potentilla indica) and barren strawberry (Potentilla sterilis, Waldsteinia fragarioides) are closely related species in other genera which resemble Fragaria.
 Strawberry tree (disambiguation) is a name for several trees that are unrelated to strawberry.
 The breeding of strawberries

References

Further reading
 Hogan, Sean (chief consultant) (2003), Flora: A Gardener's Encyclopedia, Portland, Oregon: Timber Press. .

External links

Species records in the database (for the query: genus = Fragaria) from the U.S. National Plant Germplasm System website

 
Berries
Stoloniferous plants
Rosaceae genera